Jack's Place may refer to:

 Jack's Place (restaurant), Singapore restaurant chain
 Jack's Place (TV series), an American drama series